Brithys is a genus of moths of the family Noctuidae. It includes three species.

Species
Brithys crini – Lily Borer Fabricius, 1775

References
Natural History Museum Lepidoptera genus database
Brithys at Funet

Glottulinae